The third USS Bainbridge (DD-246) was a Clemson-class destroyer in the United States Navy during World War II. She was named for Commodore William Bainbridge, who served in the War of 1812 and the First and Second Barbary Wars.

History
Bainbridge was launched 12 June 1920 by New York Shipbuilding Corporation, Camden, New Jersey; sponsored by Miss Juliet Edith Greene, great great-granddaughter of Commodore Bainbridge; commissioned 9 February 1921, Lieutenant Commander L. H. Thebaud in command; and reported to the Atlantic Fleet.

Bainbridge operated along the eastern seaboard and in the Caribbean with the fleet carrying out tactical exercises and maneuvers until October 1922, when she departed for Constantinople to join the Naval Detachment in Turkish waters. On 16 December 1922 she rescued approximately 500 survivors of the burning French military transport Vinh-Long about 10 miles off Constantinople. For extraordinary heroism during the rescue Lieutenant Commander Walter A. Edwards received the Medal of Honor.

The next year, at Newport, Rhode Island, she served temporarily as flagship of Commander, Scouting Fleet and then joined Squadron 14 Scouting Fleet, in the Atlantic.

Between 1923 and 1928 Bainbridge participated in annual fleet concentrations, tactical and joint maneuvers, and fleet and type competitions. In 1927 she was assigned temporary duty with the Special Service Squadron for patrol duty off Nicaragua during internal disturbances there. During several summers Bainbridge participated in the training program of the Scouting Fleet, making summer cruises with reservists. On 23 December 1930 she was placed out of commission in reserve at Philadelphia.

On 9 March 1932 Bainbridge was placed in reduced commission and attached to Rotating Reserve Division 19, taking part in Naval Reserve training cruises. She was placed in full commission 5 September 1933 and assigned to Destroyer Division 8, Scouting Force. For a short period she served with the Special Service Squadron in the Florida Keys and Guantánamo Bay, Cuba, and was later assigned to the Pacific, arriving at San Diego, California 5 November 1934. While serving on the west coast Bainbridge made cruises to British Columbia, Alaska, and Hawaii. She was placed out of commission in reserve at San Diego 20 November 1937.

Recommissioned 26 September 1939 Bainbridge was as signed to Division 62 and operated on the Neutrality Patrol in the Panama Canal Zone until the summer of 1940 when she reported to Key West, Florida, for patrol duty. During the early part of 1941 she cruised along the northeast coast and between May and November 1941 made three convoy escort voyages to Newfoundland and Iceland.

World War II
Between December 1941 and July 1945 Bainbridge operated as a convoy escort in the waters off the east and Gulf coasts and in the Caribbean with the exception of five trans-Atlantic escort crossings to North Africa (February–December 1943).

Convoys escorted

Disposal
Commencing her inactivation 1 July 1945, Bainbridge was decommissioned 21 July 1945 at Philadelphia and sold 30 November 1945.

Bainbridge received one battle star for her service as a convoy escort (13 June–August 1943).

References

External links
French transport Vinh-Long 

Clemson-class destroyers
World War II destroyers of the United States
Ships built by New York Shipbuilding Corporation
1920 ships